The Immediate Geographic Region of Guaxupé is one of the 10 immediate geographic regions in the Intermediate Geographic Region of Varginha, one of the 70 immediate geographic regions in the Brazilian state of Minas Gerais and one of the 509 of Brazil, created by the National Institute of Geography and Statistics (IBGE) in 2017.

Municipalities 
It comprises 9 municipalities.

 Arceburgo     
 Cabo Verde     
 Guaranésia     
 Guaxupé     
 Juruaia     
 Monte Belo     
 Muzambinho    
 Nova Resende     
 São Pedro da União

References 

Geography of Minas Gerais